Gano Coal Camp was an unincorporated community and coal town in Harlan County, Kentucky, United States.

References

Unincorporated communities in Harlan County, Kentucky
Unincorporated communities in Kentucky
Coal towns in Kentucky